PCMA is a professional organization, representing management of business events, conferences and conventions. It has more than 8,400 members, and branches in 37 countries located in North America, Europe, Asia, the Middle East, Australia and New Zealand.

PCMA was founded in 1956 in Philadelphia, Pennsylvania. In 2000, PCMA relocated from Birmingham, Alabama to its current headquarters in Chicago, Illinois.

The organization's Education Foundation provides scholarship and supports research. In 1986 it began printing its monthly magazine, known as Convene. PCMA's Digital Experience Institute provides live stream and digital events.

PCMA has an annual conference called "Convening Leaders" and also operates smaller conferences, such as the "Education Conference" and "Knowledge Exchange".

See also
 Event management
 Meeting and convention planner
 Professional conference organiser

References

External links
Official website

1957 establishments in Pennsylvania
Organizations based in Chicago
Companies based in Philadelphia
Organizations established in 1957